After the publication of the first Persian women’s magazine Danesh in Tehran in 1910–1911, Shokufeh (DMG: Šokufeh; English meaning: "Blossom"), the next Persian magazine only for women, was established in 1913. The magazine was headquartered in Tehran and published on a biweekly basis. The editor was Maryam Amid Mozayen ol-Saltaneh, the daughter of Aqa Mirza Sayyed Razi Ra’is al-Atebba, a high-ranking medical advisor at the Qajar court. Almost at the same time, Mozayen ol-Saltaneh founded the Iranian Women’s Society Anjoman Khavatin Irani, which objectives she published in the Shokufeh magazine. She supported particularly the promotion of Iranian products and industry as well as education, science and art among women.

At first the magazine dealt predominantly with topics that concerned mainly women, like equality of rights, education, upbringing, hygiene and ethics. In the course of the work of the Iranian Women’s Society the topics started to be more political, whereby the national independence and the woman's role were addressed. Shokufeh claimed not to interfere in the men's political sphere, but was unable always to keep to it, which brought the magazine under censorship. After Mozayen ol-Saltanehs death in 1919 the publication of Shokufeh was suspended.

References

External links
 Online-Version: Shokufeh 
 Digital Collections: Arabische, persische und osmanisch-türkische Periodika
 

1913 establishments in Iran
1919 disestablishments in Iran
Biweekly magazines
Defunct magazines published in Iran
Magazines established in 1913
Magazines disestablished in 1919
Magazines published in Tehran
Persian-language magazines
Qajar Iran
Women's magazines published in Iran